The Star of Nanchang ( or ) is a -tall  Ferris wheel located in the eastern Chinese city of Nanchang, the capital of Jiangxi Province.

The Star of Nanchang opened for business in May 2006, having cost 57 million yuan (roughly $7.3 million) to build. Formerly the world's tallest Ferris wheel, it was succeeded by the -tall Singapore Flyer which officially opened to the public on March 1, 2008.

The Star of Nanchang has 60 enclosed air-conditioned gondolas, each carrying up to 8 passengers, for a maximum capacity of 960 passengers per hour. A single rotation takes approximately 30 minutes; the slow rotation speed allows passengers to embark and disembark without the wheel having to stop turning.

References

External links

Shanghai Amusement Machine Engineering Co - the builder of the wheel

Ferris wheels in China
Buildings and structures in Nanchang
Tourist attractions in Jiangxi